The Tonawanda Armory is a historic armory originally built for the 25th Separate Company of the New York National Guard, and located in the city of Tonawanda in Erie County, New York. It is a brick and stone castle-like structure built in 1897, designed to be reminiscent of medieval military structures in Europe. It was designed by State architect of New York Isaac G. Perry.

The building features a five-story octagonal tower at the southwest corner and a two-story round tower at the northwest corner.

It was listed on the National Register of Historic Places in 1994. It is now privately owned and available for rental or tours.

References

External links
Tonawanda (25th Separate Company) Armory - U.S. National Register of Historic Places on Waymarking.com

Armories on the National Register of Historic Places in New York (state)
Infrastructure completed in 1897
Buildings and structures in Erie County, New York
National Register of Historic Places in Erie County, New York